Bartlett is an unincorporated community in Ramsey County, North Dakota, United States. In recent years, the town's population has dwindled.

A BNSF rail line runs through Bartlett.

History
A post office called Bartlett was established in 1883, and remained in operation until being discontinued in 1975. The community was named for Frank Bartlett, the original owner of the town site.

References 

Former municipalities in North Dakota
Unincorporated communities in Ramsey County, North Dakota
Unincorporated communities in North Dakota